An English cricket team toured Australia and Ceylon in 1882–83. Captained by Ivo Bligh, the team was on a quest "to recover those Ashes", a reference to the famous RIP notice that was published in the aftermath of England's defeat by Australia at The Oval in the previous English season.

Originally, three matches were arranged between Bligh's XI and a Combined Australia XI. Bligh's XI won two of these after losing the first. Although the actual sequence of events has never been completely confirmed, it was after winning the third match that Bligh was somehow presented with a small urn which is believed to contain the ashes of a burnt bail. He brought this back to England and it is now the most famous exhibit in the museum at Lord's Cricket Ground. England and Australia have been contesting these mythical Ashes ever since. A. fourth match was arranged ad hoc after the original series had been completed, and was won by the Australians. Following publication of Clarence P. Moody's proposed Test cricket list in 1894, all four matches were retrospectively recognised as Test matches.

Test matches
These matches were not called Tests at the time but they were retrospectively recognised after they were included in Australian Cricket and Cricketers, 1856 to 1893–94 (1894) by Clarence P. Moody. The original title of each match was Combined Australia XI v I. F. W. Bligh's XI.

First Test

Second Test

Third Test

Fourth Test

Players
England was captained by Ivo Bligh and had Edward Tylecote as its specialist wicket-keeper, the other players being Billy Bates, Dick Barlow, A. G. Steel, Charles Leslie, Walter Read, Charles Studd, Fred Morley, Billy Barnes, George Vernon and George Studd.

Australia was captained by Billy Murdoch and had Jack Blackham as wicket-keeper.  Other players to represent Australia were Billy Midwinter, Alec Bannerman, George Bonnor, Tom Horan, Percy McDonnell, George Giffen, Harry Boyle, Edwin Evans, Hugh Massie, Eugene Palmer, Tom Garrett and Fred Spofforth.

Ceylon
The team used Colombo as a stopover during its long sea voyage and played two matches against local sides in October 1882 that were not first-class. This was the first time that an overseas team visited Ceylon.

Other matches in Australia
Besides the four against Combined Australia, Bligh's XI played in fourteen matches against colonial and club teams. Some of these were scheduled for two days' play, others for three days.

References

External sources
 CricketArchive tour itinerary

Further reading
 The Wisden Book of Test Cricket 1877–1978 by Bill Frindall
 Chris Harte, A. History of Australian Cricket, Andre Deutsch, 1993

1882 in Ceylon
1882 in English cricket
1882 in Australian cricket
1883 in English cricket
1883 in Australian cricket
1882
1882-83
1882
International cricket competitions from 1844 to 1888
1882-83
Sri Lankan cricket seasons from 1880–81 to 1971–72